Frank Earl Black (born 29 July 1943) is a retired Australian professional wrestler who wrestled under the name Earl Black.

Personal life
Black has a son who is also professional wrestler known as Earl Black Jr.

Championships and accomplishments
Stampede Wrestling
NWA International Tag Team Championship (Calgary version) (2 times) – with Tiger Joe Tomasso
Far East Championship
Other titles
Australian Heavyweight Championship (1 time)

References

External links
 Online World of Wrestling profile
 

1941 births
Australian male professional wrestlers
Living people
Sportsmen from New South Wales
Sportspeople from Sydney
Stampede Wrestling alumni
20th-century professional wrestlers
Stampede Wrestling International Tag Team Champions